Gilbert Thomas Kubski (born October 12, 1954) is an American former professional baseball player who appeared in 22 games as an outfielder in Major League Baseball(MLB) for the  California Angels.

Career
The son of Al Kubski, a former minor league player and manager and longtime MLB scout, Gil was born in Longview, Texas, graduated from high school in Granada Hills, California, and was selected by the Angels in the first round of the 1975 January Major League Baseball Draft after playing at California State University, Northridge.

Kubski's playing career lasted for eight pro seasons, with his 22-game MLB trial occurring during his sixth season in organized baseball in 1980. He started 15 games and appeared as a defensive replacement or pinch hitter in seven more.  His 16 MLB hits included three doubles. He retired as an active player in 1982 after 859 games in pro ball.

He has remained in baseball, however, as a scout for the Chicago Cubs, San Francisco Giants, Baltimore Orioles, the Major League Baseball Scouting Bureau and the Arizona Diamondbacks.

References

1954 births
Living people
American expatriate baseball players in Canada
American people of Polish descent
Arizona Diamondbacks scouts
Baltimore Orioles scouts
Baseball players from Texas
California Angels players
Cal State Northridge Matadors baseball players
Chicago Cubs scouts
El Paso Diablos players
Indianapolis Indians players
Major League Baseball outfielders
Salinas Packers players
Salt Lake City Gulls players
San Francisco Giants scouts
Syracuse Chiefs players
Vancouver Canadians players